Manyumow Achol (born 10 December 1999) is a South Sudanese footballer who plays as a winger or a midfielder for FK Auda in the Latvian Higher League and the South Sudan national team.

Early life
Achol was born in South Sudan, then part of Sudan, but left with his grandmother and arrived in New Zealand aged six as a refugee, settling in Wellington.

Club career
Achol played for his school team at St Patrick's College in Wellington, alongside New Zealand international Liberato Cacace. Achol helped his college team win the Wellington Premier Youth football league, scoring in the 2–1 final against Hutt International Boys' School.

Achol played for both Wellington Olympic reserves and their first team, who played in the Capital Football Central League. He was part of their under-19 team that finished runner-up in the Napier U-19 tournament to Ellerslie. Achol then had a brief spell with fellow Central League team Lower Hutt before he joined Wellington United for the 2019 season, captaining the team.

Achol made one appearance for the Wellington Phoenix Reserves in the ISPS Handa Premiership, coming on as a substitute in a 5–0 loss against Waitakere United on 5 November 2017.

In 2020, Achol signed with Australian club Kingston City who played in the second division of the National Premier League Victoria. Just before the season was due to start, Victoria went into lockdown due to COVID-19 and the league was postponed for a month. Before the suspension was lifted, Football Victoria extended it again until 31 May 2020. Achol returned to New Zealand where he played for Eastern Suburbs in the NRFL Premier.

In 2021, Achol signed with Hawke's Bay United who play in the ISPS Handa Men's Premiership. He played his first game for the club against Team Wellington on 17 January 2021, coming on as a substitute in the second half. He got his first start in the league, a week later in their 4–1 win against Hamilton Wanderers.

On 31 March, it was announced that Achol had joined Lower Hutt City who he had played for previously and are currently playing in the New Zealand Central League. His first game back was against Wainuiomata where Achol also scored in the 25 minute.

In January 2022, Achol signed with Gulf United FC in the UAE Third Division and was reunited with former Wellington Phoenix teammate Steven Taylor. In March 2022, Achol signed with FK Auda in the Latvian Higher League.  Gulf United were eventually crowned champions for the UAE Third Division 2021–22 Season, however Achol did not feature in enough competitive features to receive a medal.

On 17 June 2022, Achol scored his first goal for FK Auda in the 94th minute during a Latvian Higher League match against Spartaks Jūrmala.

International career
On 12 November 2020, Achol was called up to play for South Sudan in their qualifiers for the 2021 Africa Cup of Nations games against Uganda. Starting in the first game, Achol played 68 minutes before being substituted in a 1–0 loss. This was followed by another start in the return fixture that South Sudan won 1–0.

Achol was again called up for the last two group games against Malawi and Burkina Faso, getting a full 90 minutes in the first game and 60 minutes in the second. As South Sudan lost both of the games 1–0, they finished last in qualifying Group B.

References

1999 births
Living people
South Sudanese footballers
Association football wingers
Association football midfielders
Rio Grande RedStorm men's soccer players
South Sudan international footballers
South Sudanese expatriate footballers
South Sudanese expatriate sportspeople in the United States
Expatriate soccer players in the United States
South Sudanese emigrants to New Zealand
Naturalised citizens of New Zealand
Association footballers from Wellington City
New Zealand association footballers
New Zealand Football Championship players
New Zealand expatriate association footballers
New Zealand expatriate sportspeople in the United States
New Zealand people of South Sudanese descent
South Sudanese expatriate sportspeople in Latvia
Expatriate footballers in Latvia
Latvian Higher League players
FK Auda players
South Sudanese refugees
New Zealand expatriate sportspeople in Latvia
New Zealand expatriate sportspeople in Australia
New Zealand expatriate sportspeople in the United Arab Emirates
South Sudanese expatriate sportspeople in Australia
South Sudanese expatriate sportspeople in the United Arab Emirates